Norma Safford Vela is an American television writer, director and producer. She produced the ABC series George, starring George Foreman.

Credits
Her credits include What I Like About You, Good Advice, Studio 5-B, The Jersey, The Slap Maxwell Story, The Days and Nights of Molly Dodd, Spenser: For Hire, St. Elsewhere, Almost Home, Life with Bonnie, V.I.P., That's Life, Sabrina, the Teenage Witch, Vanishing Son, George, Designing Women, Davis Rules, and Roseanne.

References

External links

Year of birth missing (living people)
American television directors
American television producers
American women television producers
American television writers
American women television directors
American women television writers
Living people
21st-century American women